"Fireworks" is a song by German disco and house music producer and DJ Purple Disco Machine featuring British singer-songwriter Moss Kena and American indie pop duo The Knocks, it was released on 19 February 2021. It is the second single from Purple Disco Machine's second studio album, Exotica.

Composition
The song is written in the key of C# major, with a tempo of 118 beats per minute.

Music video
The music video was released on 19 February 2021, and directed by Greg Barth. It features "street dancing gangs of the 'Boomers' and 'Gen-Z' battling it out in the ultimate turf war." The video contains references to denial of human-triggered climate change, among other social phenomenons.

Credits and personnel
Credits adapted from Tidal.

 Purple Disco Machine (Tino Schmidt) – writer, composition, associate interpreter
 Moss Kena – writer, composition, associate interpreter
 James Patterson (The Knocks) – writer, composition, associate interpreter
 Benjamin Ruttner (The Knocks) – writer, composition, associate interpreter
 Paul Harris – writer, composition
 Amir Saleem – writer, composition
 Monte – mixing engineer

Charts

Weekly charts

Year-end charts

Certifications

Release history

References

2021 singles
2021 songs
Purple Disco Machine songs
The Knocks songs
Positiva Records singles